The 1939 California tropical storm, also known as the 1939 Long Beach tropical storm, and El Cordonazo, was a tropical cyclone that affected Southern California in September 1939. Formerly a hurricane, it was the only tropical storm to make landfall in California in the twentieth century. Fisherman in the villages along the Mexican coast have named these storms, the Lash of St. Francis. The only other known tropical cyclone to directly affect California at tropical storm intensity or higher is the 1858 San Diego hurricane (though it did not make landfall), and only three other eastern Pacific tropical cyclones have produced gale-force winds in the continental United States. The tropical storm caused heavy flooding, leaving many dead, mostly at sea.

Meteorological synopsis
On September 15, a tropical depression formed off the southern coast of Central America. It moved west-northwestward, passing southwest of the Revillagigedo Islands. It then turned north and then northeastward. For some time, it was a hurricane, and it lost that intensity on or just before September 25. The tropical storm made landfall near San Pedro, California, early on September 25, with winds of severe gale strength. It dissipated later that day. The strongest reported sustained wind was of Force 11 strength, which was reported by a ship, making this system a minimal hurricane. The lowest pressure was reported by the same ship, and was at 28.67 inHg (971 mb).

Due to the rotation of the Earth, tropical cyclones in the Northern Hemisphere tend to move from east to west. This causes tropical cyclones to approach the West Coast of the United States infrequently. Another inhibiting factor for a California landfall is the surrounding water temperatures. Because of the water currents, the waters off the coast of California are rarely above , which is too cold for hurricanes to sustain themselves. This tropical cyclone was rare enough that only three other eastern Pacific tropical cyclones brought tropical storm-force winds to the Continental United States during the twentieth century. The Long Beach Tropical Storm was the only one to make landfall; the other three hit Mexico before moving north, but didn't make landfall in California.

Preparations and impact

The storm dropped heavy rain in California, with  falling in Los Angeles ( in 24 hours) and  recorded at Mount Wilson, both September records. At the Citrus Belt near Anaheim, at least  of rain fell. The  at Mount Wilson is one of California's highest rainfall amounts from a tropical cyclone, although at least one system has a higher point maximum. The Los Angeles River, which was usually low during September, became a raging torrent.

With heavy rain immediately preceding the tropical storm, flooding killed 45 in Southern California. At sea, 48 were killed. However, the National Hurricane Center only attributes 45 deaths to this system. Six people caught on beaches drowned during the storm. Most other deaths were at sea. Twenty-four died aboard a vessel called the Spray as it attempted to dock at Point Mugu. The two survivors, a man and a woman, swam ashore and then walked five miles (8 km) to Oxnard. Fifteen people from Ventura drowned aboard a fishing boat named Lur. Many other vessels were sunk, capsized, or blown ashore.

Many low-lying areas were flooded. The Hamilton Bowl overflowed, flooding the Signal Hill area. Along the shore from Malibu to Huntington Beach houses were flooded. Throughout the area, thousands of people were stranded in their homes. Streets in Los Angeles proper were covered with water, flooding buildings and stalling cars. Construction on a flood control project in the Los Angeles River's channel by the Army Corps of Engineers was stopped by the flooding. Windows throughout Long Beach were smashed by the wind. At Belmont Shore, waves undermined ten homes before washing them away. Debris was scattered throughout the coast. Agriculture was disrupted. Crop damage in the Coachella Valley reached 75%.

Rains washed away a  section of the Southern Pacific Railroad near Indio, and a stretch of the Santa Fe main line near Needles. Waters backing up from a storm drain under construction in the San Gabriel Valley blocked California State Route 60. The pier at Point Mugu was washed away. In Pasadena, 5000 people were left without electricity and 2000 telephones lost service. Communications throughout the affected area was disrupted or rendered impossible. The total amount of damage was $2 million (1939 USD, $ million in  USD).

The tropical storm was credited with at least one beneficial effect: it ended a vicious heat wave that had lasted for over a week and killed at least 90 people.

People were caught unprepared by the storm, which was described as "sudden". Some people were still on the beach at Long Beach when the wind reached , at which time lifeguards closed the beach. Schools were closed there. At sea, the Coast Guard and Navy conducted rescue operations, saving dozens of people. In response to Californians' unpreparedness, the Weather Bureau established a forecast office for southern California, which began operations in February 1940.

See also

 List of tropical cyclones
 List of California hurricanes
 List of wettest tropical cyclones in California
 1858 San Diego hurricane

References

External links
 USA Today Tropical Storm Info 
 10 most important California weather events
 More storm information
 An Overview of the Los Angeles Climate
 A history of Significant Local Weather Events

1930s Pacific hurricane seasons
Floods in California
 (1939)
Category 1 Pacific hurricanes
California tropical storm
California Tropical Storm
California Tropical Storm
California tropical storm